East Launceston is a residential locality in the local government area (LGA) of Launceston in the Launceston LGA region of Tasmania. The 2016 census recorded a population of 2143 for East Launceston. 78.6% of people were born in Australia and 87.3% of people spoke only English at home. The most common responses for religion were No Religion 36.8%, Anglican 20.7% and Catholic 16.2%.
It is a suburb of Launceston.

History 
East Launceston was gazetted as a locality in 1963.

Geography
Most of the boundaries are survey lines.

Road infrastructure 
Route A3 (Brisbane Street / Elphin Road) passes the north-western to eastern boundaries, from where various streets provide access to the locality.

References

Suburbs of Launceston, Tasmania
Localities of City of Launceston